Crystal Murray (born 2002) is a French R&B singer-songwriter.

Early life 
Murray was born in Paris to an African-American jazz musician who played saxophone and a Franco-Spanish mother who ran a world music production company. She cites African-American music as her main influence, growing up listening to Macy Gray, John Coltrane, Marvin Gaye, Minnie Ripperton and Beyoncé. She frequented jazz clubs and often accompanied her father on tours.

In 2016, she founded the Gucci Gang, a group of female influencers associated with the fashion and arts scene. The group used their platform to create a "safe place" for survivors of sexual harassment.

Career 
In 2018 she released "After Ten" (produced by PH Trigano). Her debut EP I Was Wrong was released in 2020 and cemented her rising-star status.

In 2020, she released "Princess" and "August Knows". The tracks are featured on the soundtrack of Cedric Klapisch's 2018 film Deux moi. Klapisch later directed the video clip for "August Knows".

In June 2021, she performed neo-soul track "Boss" on the German music performance platform COLORS.

On 11 February 2022, Murray released a new EP titled Twisted Bases.

Influences and style 
Murray cites African-American musicians such as Macy Gray, Betty Davis, and Kelis as her three biggest influences, as well as artists like Björk, Tame Impala, and Flavien Berger. She was also heavily influenced by her musician parents growing up. Her music is a mixture of soul, jazz, house music and R&B.

Discography

EP

Singles

As primary artist 
 August Knows (2018)
 Princess (2018)
 After Ten (2019)
GGGB (Hotel Room Drama) (2020)
Creeps (Hotel Room Drama) [feat. Elheist] (2020)
Boss (2021)
Like It Nasty (2021)

As featured artist 

 "Diamond Man" (Bamao Yendé ft Crystal Murray)

References 

French women singers
French women singer-songwriters
French rhythm and blues singers
Singers from Paris
Living people
2002 births